The 1969–70 Austrian Hockey League season was the 40th season of the Austrian Hockey League, the top level of ice hockey in Austria. Eight teams participated in the league, and EC KAC won the championship.

Regular season

Playoffs

Group A

Group B

EC Pradl was relegated.

External links
Austrian Ice Hockey Association

Austrian Hockey League seasons
Aus
Aust